Salt-Water Poems and Ballads is a book of poetry on themes of seafaring and maritime history by John Masefield. It was first published in 1916 by Macmillan, with illustrations by Charles Pears.

Many of the poems had been published in Masefield's earlier collections, Salt-Water Ballads (1902), Ballads (1903) and Ballads and Poems (1910). They were included in The Collected Poems of John Masefield published by Heinemann in 1923.

Salt-Water Poems and Ballads includes "Sea-Fever" and "Cargoes", two of Masefield's best known poems.

"Sea-Fever"
"Sea-Fever" first appeared in Salt-Water Ballads – Masefield's first volume of poetry published in 1902 in London by Grant Richards.

In The Collected Poems of John Masefield the opening line was changed to the text now more commonly anthologised: "I must go down to the sea again, to the lonely sea and the sky". The first lines of the second and third stanzas retained the form "I must down to the seas again [...]".

"Cargoes"
"Cargoes" first appeared in Ballads – Masefield's second volume of poetry, published in 1903 in London by Elkin Mathews.

Musical settings
"Sea-Fever" has been set to music by many composers, including Stephen DeCesare, John Coventry on his EP "The Roots of Folk Volume 2" and Patrick Clifford on his album American Wake; the most famous version is by John Ireland. The poem has also been set, for boys' emerging voices, by Oliver Tarney and published by Oxford University Press. and by Kavisha Mazzella, a Western Australia-born musician and artist. Andy Vine, an English songwriter, has also set the words to a folk melody of his own invention.

English composer Frederick Keel (1871-1954) set three of the poems for voice and piano in his 1919 collection Three Salt-Water Ballads: "Port of Many Ships", "Trade Winds" and "Mother Carey".

Cultural references
"Sea-Fever" is quoted by Willy Wonka in the 1971 film Willy Wonka & the Chocolate Factory.

The poem is quoted in part by Captain James T. Kirk in both the Star Trek: The Original Series episode "The Ultimate Computer" and the film Star Trek V: The Final Frontier and is also quoted in the 2004 film Sky Captain and the World of Tomorrow.

Sea-Fever is also recited in during the Last Supper scene in the 12-hour Facebook Live event episode of The Third Day (miniseries), Part 2: Autumn.

References

Further reading
 Babington Smith, Constance (1978). John Masefield: A Life. Oxford University Press.

External links

 Salt-Water Poems and Ballads online at the Internet Archive

English poetry collections
1916 books
Macmillan Publishers books